Carlo Cutillo, O.S.B. (1626–1704) was a Roman Catholic prelate who served as Bishop of Minori (1694–1704).

Biography
Carlo Cutillo was born in Montefusco, Italy on 8 July 1626 and ordained a priest in the Order of Saint Benedict.
On 13 September 1694, he was appointed during the papacy of Pope Innocent XII as Bishop of Minori.
On 19 September 1694, he was consecrated bishop by Bandino Panciatici, Cardinal-Priest of San Pancrazio, with Stefano Giuseppe Menatti, Bishop of Como, and Pierre Lambert Ledrou, Titular Bishop of Porphyreon, with serving as co-consecrators. 
He served as Bishop of Minori until his death in December 1704.

References

External links and additional sources
 (for Chronology of Bishops) 
 (for Chronology of Bishops) 

17th-century Italian Roman Catholic bishops
18th-century Italian Roman Catholic bishops
Bishops appointed by Pope Innocent XII
1626 births
1704 deaths